Kahn-e Mahalleh or Kahn Mahalleh or Kohan Mahalleh may refer to:
 Kahn-e Mahalleh-ye Bala
 Kahn-e Mahalleh-ye Pain